Isoamyl acetate, also known as isopentyl acetate, is an organic compound that is the ester formed from isoamyl alcohol and acetic acid, with the molecular formula C7H14O2.It is a colorless liquid that is only slightly soluble in water, but very soluble in most organic solvents.  Isoamyl acetate has a strong odor which is described as similar to both banana and pear. Pure isoamyl acetate, or mixtures of isoamyl acetate, amyl acetate, and other flavors may be referred to as banana oil.

Production
Isoamyl acetate is prepared by the acid catalyzed reaction (Fischer esterification) between isoamyl alcohol and glacial acetic acid as shown in the reaction equation below.  Typically, sulfuric acid is used as the catalyst.  Alternatively, p-toluenesulfonic acid or an acidic ion exchange resin can be used as the catalyst.

Applications
Isoamyl acetate is used to confer banana or pear flavor in foods. Banana oil commonly refers to a solution of isoamyl acetate in ethanol that is used as an artificial flavor.

It is also used as a solvent for some varnishes and nitrocellulose lacquers. As a solvent and carrier for materials such as nitrocellulose, it was extensively used in the aircraft industry for stiffening and wind-proofing fabric flying surfaces, where it and its derivatives were generally known as 'aircraft dope'. Now that most aircraft wings are made of metal, such use is mostly limited to historically accurate reproductions and scale models.

Because of its intense, pleasant odor and its low toxicity, isoamyl acetate is used to test the effectiveness of respirators or gas masks.

Occurrence in nature
Isoamyl acetate occurs naturally in the banana plant and it is also produced synthetically.

Isoamyl acetate is released by a honey bee's sting apparatus where it serves as a pheromone beacon to attract other bees and provoke them to sting.

References 

Flavors
Insect pheromones
Ester solvents
Acetate esters
Sweet-smelling chemicals